Betws Bledrws, is a village between Lampeter and Llangybi, Ceredigion, Wales that was also known as Derry Ormond when under the influence of Derry Ormond Mansion.

Etymology 
The first part of the name of the village comes from the Middle English word bedhus, meaning "prayer house", which became betws in Welsh.

Derry Ormond Mansion, demolished in 1953, lies close to the village. Linked to the old Mansion is the now crumbling Tŵr y Dderi that can be seen for miles around. Betws Bledrws Church was rebuilt in the 19th century.

Postcode SA48 8
Gridref SN596520

References

External link

 

Villages in Ceredigion